Darragh O'Mahony (born 18 August 1972) is an Irish former rugby union player who played on the wing for Moseley, Bedford Blues, Saracens and Ireland.

References

External links
ESPNScrum Profile
Ireland Profile

1972 births
Living people
Rugby union players from County Cork
Irish rugby union players
Ireland international rugby union players
Saracens F.C. players
Moseley Rugby Football Club players
Lansdowne Football Club players
University College Cork RFC players
University College Dublin R.F.C. players
Bedford Blues players
Rugby union wings